The Free Secession was an association of modern artists in Berlin organizing joint exhibitions 1914–1923.

The Free Secession was formed after 42 members in late 1913 left the Berlin Secession, which thereby lost a majority of its members and nearly all of its most prominent artists. Max Liebermann, a former co-founder and leader of the Berlin Secession was made honorary president of the Free Secession.

Notable members

References

Modern art
German artist groups and collectives
1914 establishments in Germany
Arts in Berlin